Edmonton-City Centre is a provincial electoral district in Alberta, Canada. The district will be one of 87 districts mandated to return a single member (MLA) to the Legislative Assembly of Alberta using the first past the post method of voting. The current MLA is David Shepherd, first elected in the 2019 Alberta election.

Geography
The district is located in central Edmonton, containing the city's downtown core as well as the neighbourhoods of Oliver, Rossdale, Queen Mary Park, Central McDougall, Spruce Avenue, and Westwood, also including the main campus of MacEwan University.

History

The district was created in 2017 when the Electoral Boundaries Commission recommended renaming Edmonton-Centre (to reduce confusion with similarly-named federal districts). The Commission also extended its border north to the Yellowhead Highway between 97 St NW and 109 St NW, adding the Northern Alberta Institute of Technology's main campus to the riding.

Electoral results

References

Alberta provincial electoral districts
Politics of Edmonton